Leadville is a statutory city and county seat of Lake County, Colorado.

Leadville may also refer to:

 Leadville (book), a 2000 book by Edward Platt
 Leadville, British Columbia, Canada, a ghost town
 Leadville, New South Wales, Australia
 Leadville Airport, in Leadville, Colorado
 Leadville Municipal Airport, a Colorado World War II Army Airfield in Leadville, Colorado
 Leadville Historic District, in Leadville, Colorado
 Leadville National Forest, Colorado, divided between Arapaho, Cochetopa and Pike National Forests in 1930

See also
 
 Leadmill (disambiguation)